The Bank guarantee case or Bürge (19 October 1993) BVerfGE 89, 214 is a German contract law case, concerning the interpretation of private law, and particularly the law of contract, in a way that is compatible with basic human rights principles. It was held that the power of freedom of contract must be interpreted in a way that protects people's genuine (rather than formal) autonomy, in those situations where there is a structural inequality of bargaining power.

Facts
The case concerned a series of claimants, including spouses and children, of a party which had mortgaged the family home, in order to secure a loan from a bank. The banks had required that, in return for the loans, the family would guarantee the debts. The validity of these contracts were challenged.

Judgment

See also

Barclays Bank plc v O’Brien [1994] 1 AC 180

Notes

References
BS Markesinis, H Unberath and A Johnston, The German Law of Contract (2010) Case No 81, for partial translation

Contract case law
Federal Constitutional Court cases